Channel 25 is a commercial television channel in Mongolia. Channel 25 was established on 27 September 1996 by JAAG FM 107 radio. Channel 25 is the first non-government owned television channel in Mongolia.

See also
Media of Mongolia
Communications in Mongolia

External links
Official Site  

Television companies of Mongolia
Ulaanbaatar
Television channels and stations established in 1996